The Cumberland County Courthouse is the historic traditional courthouse for Cumberland County, New Jersey, located in the county seat of Bridgeton in the 15th vicinage.

It was designed by Watson & Huckel and built in 1909.
It is a contributing property to the Bridgeton Historic District listed in 1982 on the New Jersey Register of Historic Places (#1020) and the National Register of Historic Places (#82001043). Funding for its restoration has been partially provided by the New Jersey Historic Trust.

See also
County courthouses in New Jersey
Richard J. Hughes Justice Complex
Federal courthouses in New Jersey
National Register of Historic Places listings in Cumberland County, New Jersey

References 

County courthouses in New Jersey
Bridgeton, New Jersey
National Register of Historic Places in Burlington County, New Jersey
1909 establishments in New Jersey
Government buildings completed in 1909
New Jersey Register of Historic Places
Courthouses on the National Register of Historic Places in New Jersey
Buildings and structures in Cumberland County, New Jersey
Historic district contributing properties in New Jersey
Clock towers in New Jersey